Giesecke+Devrient, also known as (G+D), is a German company headquartered in Munich that provides banknote and securities printing, smart cards, and cash handling systems.

History
 
Founded in 1852 by Hermann Giesecke and Alphonse Devrient, the firm initially specialized in high-quality printing, notably currency and securities printing. From the 1850s to the 1870s the firm printed some of the important biblical editions of Constantin von Tischendorf. The partnership's reputation for quality work was confirmed at the 1867 international exhibition in Paris.

Giesecke+Devrient supplied currency during the inflation in the Weimar Republic in the 1920s, one of the most prominent cases of hyperinflation. It also printed tickets to the 1936 Olympics in Germany and did business with Spain under Franco. Its role in facilitating the destruction of the economy of Zimbabwe through another printers' breeding of hyperinflation under Mugabe is well-known.

In the modern period, G+D has expanded operations to include banknote processing, smart cards, identification systems, and e-payments. The firm is the world's second largest supplier of banknotes, with annual revenues of $2.45 billion. They have over 11,600 employees, and some 50 subsidiaries and joint ventures around the world. The company operates printing facilities in Germany (Munich, Leipzig), as well as Kuala Lumpur, Malaysia. G+D currently supplies euro notes for the German Bundesbank; and the company supplies banknotes for many other nations.

After World War II, Leipzig ended up becoming part of the communist East Germany, and the company's printing facility was nationalized by the government as VEB Wertpapierdruckerei, and began printing banknotes of East German mark. The company was re-established in Munich by Siegfried Otto, husband of Jutta Devrient, a descendant of Alphonse Devrient. In 1958, the company received a commission from Deutsche Bundesbank to print Deutsche Mark banknotes.

In 1991, following German reunification, the company bought back the Leipzig facility from Treuhandanstalt, the East German privatization agency.

In 1989, the Komori technology for printing banknotes was introduced in Europe when G+D ordered a small printing machine.

In 1999, Giesecke+Devrient acquired the British American Bank Note Company, and renamed it to BA International Inc.

In 2000, Giesecke+Devrient established its North American headquarters in Dulles, Virginia, a suburb of Washington, D.C.

The firm produces special paper for use in instruments such as banknotes, checks, bonds, certificates, passports and other identification, and tickets.

In addition to Germany, Giesecke+Devrient has printed banknotes for other various countries through the years, including Cambodia, Croatia, Ethiopia, Guatemala, Jamaica, Lithuania, Peru, Zaire, and Zimbabwe. In Japan, G+D is active in the fields of cards and banknotes.

In October 2002, Giesecke+Devrient, along with the Information Security Group, Royal Holloway, University of London and Vodafone set up the Smart Card Centre, which is part of the ISG at Royal Holloway.

In 2012, Giesecke+Devrient closed BA International, its banknote printing operation in Ottawa, Ontario, Canada.

In January 2015, G+D founded Veridos GmbH in Berlin as a cooperation with Bundesdruckerei, with G+D holding 60%. This company is offering secure identification products for governments, such as ID cards, passports, and automated border control systems.

In 2017, Giesecke+Devrient joined the Verimi identification platform, which together with more than a dozen well-known German and foreign companies, offers a portal for the protection of digital identity and personal data. G+D has held a 10% stake in Verimi since January 2018.

In April 2018, the previous Giesecke & Devrient GmbH (G&D) was renamed to Giesecke+Devrient GmbH (G+D) as the mother company. The previous business units were spun off as separate fully owned daughter companies as follows:
 Banknote related business into G+D Currency Technology GmbH (G+D CT) which owns the Papierfabrik Louisenthal GmbH (PL) with its banknote substrates and security elements, and the banknote printing works in Malaysia.
 Smart card related business with payment cards, SIM card and eSIM and security solutions into G+D Mobile Security GmbH (G+D MS).

In 2018, Build38 was created as a spin-off and took over part of the Mobile App Security and Intelligence portfolio. It has its head office in Munich, development in Barcelona and sales office in Singapore.

In 2019, G+D took a 4.85% stake in the Berlin brighter AI Technologies GmbH, focusing more on the area of biometric identity protection, such as facial anonymization.

In 2020, G+D acquired a stake of the Swiss software company Netcetera (announced to be increased from 30 % to 60% from February 2023) and the crypto-asset company Metaco. 

In 2021, G+D acquired the British Pod Group specialized in scalable internet of things (IoT) connectivity solutions. It invested into the start-ups FNA and stashcat for secure communications. It started pilot projects for central bank digital currency (CBDC), among others with Bank of Ghana and Bank of Thailand.

Anti-counterfeiting
In November 2009 Giesecke+Devrient announced plans to form a new company with SAP AG and Nokia Corp., named Original1, to deliver product authentication and anti-counterfeiting services globally. The headquarters is in Frankfurt, Germany.  Original1 offers user authentication, end-to-end encryption of the information flow and database encryption. Original1 On-Demand is an online product for brand product protection.As of August 2012, Original1 is in liquidation. The supervisory board (40% SAP, 40% Nokia, 20% Giesecke+Devrient) dismissed the 3 managing directors with 6 months notice and 6 months severance. The remaining employees were dismissed with 3 months notice and no severance.

Zimbabwe involvement
Giesecke+Devrient have a history of doing business with Rhodesia and its successor state Zimbabwe going back to 1965, and they have been supplying security paper for banknotes, passports and other instruments to the government of Zimbabwe throughout the hyperinflation in Zimbabwe.

In June 2008 U.S. officials announced they would not take any action against the firm.
It was reported that on 1 July 2008 company's management board decided to cease delivering banknote paper to the Reserve Bank of Zimbabwe with immediate effect. The decision was in response to an "official request" from the German government and calls for international sanctions by the European Union and the United Nations. Dr. Karsten Ottenberg, CEO and Chairman of the G+D Management Board, explained:
"Our decision is a reaction to the political tension in Zimbabwe, which is mounting significantly rather than easing as expected, and takes account of the critical evaluation by the international community, German government and general public."

See also
Hyperinflation
Hyperinflation in Zimbabwe

References
Notes

Bibliography
 Bender, Klaus W. (2006).  Moneymakers: the Secret World of Banknote Printing. Weinheim, Germany: Wiley-VCH Verlag. ;  OCLC 69326754
  Faulmann, Karl. (1882).  Illustrirte Geschichte der Buchdruckerkunst: mit besonderer Berücksichtigung ihrer technischen Entwicklung bis zur Gegenwart. Vienna: A. Hartleben. .

External links

 G+D corporate website
 

Printing companies of Germany
Banknote printing companies
Manufacturing companies based in Munich
Manufacturing companies established in 1852
Publishing companies established in 1852
German companies established in 1852